Ellam Sheriyakum is a 2021 Indian Malayalam-language political drama film directed by Jibu Jacob. The film stars Asif Ali, Rajisha Vijayan and Sidhique. Based in central Travancore and parts of Kannur, the film revolves around a political member and his family and how politics plays a role in their personal lives. The film released in theatres on 19 November 2021 and was as a Box-Office failure.

Cast
 Asif Ali as Party Loyalist Comrade Vineeth
 Rajisha Vijayan as Ancy daughter of KC Chacko
 Sidhique as Former Chief Minister 
K. C.Chacko MLA 
 Tulasi Shivamani as Mariyamma (Ancy's Mother)
 Indrans as dressmaker (tailor) 
 Kalabhavan Shajohn as Adv. V. M Satheesan MLA 
 Balu Varghese as Comrade Nivin George
 Sruthy Jayan as Comrade Ajitha Narayanan
 Sudheer Karamana as Comrade Vijayan (local committee secretary)
 G. Suresh Kumar as UPF Chief Minister Sukumaran Nair
 Johny Antony as Johnson Asst. of KC Chacko MLA 
 Anjali Nair
 Sreejith Ravi as LPF Party Leader
 Rajesh Sharma
 Kottayam Ramesh as Kerala Congress Leader and Current Revenue Minister K.M.Johny
 Ouseppachan as quarry owner 
 Abdul Majeed as KPCC leader
 Monisha Arshak
 Sethulakshmi as Reethama
 Jordy Poonjar
 Kichu Tellas
 Neeraja Rajendran
 Jiffin George

Release
The film was scheduled for a release on 17 September 2021 but was postponed due to the COVID-19 pandemic. It had a delayed release in theatres on 19 November 2021, distributed by Central Pictures.

Reception

Critical response
The Times of India rated the film 4 on a scale of 5, noting that the film is "a thought-provoking political drama", and that the success of the film is in "how it does not support any ideology, but shows a mirror to the problems in both political parties, and is not pedantic while doing so." The Hindu'''s S. R. Praveen wrote that the director Jibu Jacob is "on the lookout for that perfect balance between a family drama and a political commentary" like in his earlier film Vellimoonga, but "take the light-heartedness, humour, and engaging script out of that film [Vellimoonga], and you would be left with Ellam Sheriyakum." Malayala Manorama rated the film 2.5/5 and wrote: "A stale plot, unconvincing situations and sloppy scripting is the bane of formulaic filmmaking. Ellam Sheriyakum, roughly translated as 'everything will be all right', fails to tackle all of these common errors." Sowmya Rajendran of The News Minute'' rated the film with 2 stars out of 5 and was critical of screenplay stating, "[it] is overstuffed with too many issues bordering on caricature". Rajendran felt that last 30 minutes of film were dull to the point that she had the urge to leave. Concluding, she wrote, "Maybe on paper everything sounded great, but what the audience witnesses and understands is a total misfire".

Box office
The film was a Box-office failure.

Soundtrack
The soundtrack is composed by Ouseppachan on lyrics of B. K. Harinarayanan. It is Ouseppachan's 200th film. The first song "Pinnenthe" was released on 24 October 2021 by Satyam Audios.

References

External links
 

2021 films
2020s Malayalam-language films
Indian political drama films
Films scored by Ouseppachan
2021 drama films